The Crystal Palace F.C. Under-21s is the Under-21 Development team of Crystal Palace Football Club. They compete in Premier League 2, the top level of reserve football in England and also play in the EFL Trophy. 

The Crystal Palace F.C. Academy consists of the Under-18s and other youth teams of Crystal Palace Football Club. The Under-18 team play in the U18 Premier League. The academy has produced a number of well known players over the years such as Kenny Sansom, Gareth Southgate, Wayne Routledge, Nathaniel Clyne and Ivory Coast international Wilfried Zaha.

U21 Development squad

Out on loan

U18 Academy squad

Honours

Reserves/Development Squad
The Football Combination
Champions (1): 2002–03 
 Runners-up (1): 2001–02 
Premier League 2
Division 2 Play-off Winners (1): 2020–21
Kent League
Champions (1): 1913–14 
 Runners-up (2): 1910–11, 1912–13

Academy
 FA Youth Cup
 Winners (2): 1976–77, 1977–78
 Runners-up (2): 1991–92, 1996–97
Southern Junior Floodlit Cup
 Winners (1): 1996–97
 Runners-up (1): 1976–77
U18 Premier League – South Group
 Runners-up (1): 2020–21
U15 National Floodlit Cup
 Winners (1): 2018–19
 Runners-up (1): 2021–22

Notable Academy graduates
Players who have made at least 100 appearances for Crystal Palace.

 
 Roy Bailey
 Peter Berry
 Johnny Byrne
 Bill Glazier
 Alan Stephenson
 David Payne
 John Jackson
 Steve Kember
 Paul Hammond
 David Swindlehurst
 Nick Chatterton
 
 Paul Hinshelwood
 Kenny Sansom
 Vince Hilaire
 Billy Gilbert
 Gary Stebbing
 Richard Shaw
 Gareth Southgate
 Steven Thomson
 Hayden Mullins
 Wayne Routledge
 Gary Borrowdale
 
 Ben Watson
 Tom Soares
 Nathaniel Clyne
 Wilfried Zaha
 Jerry Murphy
 Clinton Morrison
 Sean Scannell
 George Ndah
 Jim Cannon
 Ian Walsh
 Peter Nicholas

Young Player of the Year

Note: This award was renamed Development Player of the Year from 2015.

References

Crystal Palace F.C.
London League (football)
Football academies in England
Premier League International Cup